Türkan Şoray (born 28 June 1945) is a Turkish actress, writer and film director of Circassian origin. She is known as "Sultan" of the Cinema of Turkey. She started her career in 1960, and won her first award as the most successful actress at the 1st Antalya Golden Orange Film Festival for the movie Acı Hayat. Having appeared in more than 222 films, Şoray has starred in the most feature films for a female actress worldwide. On 12 March 2010, Şoray was chosen as a UNICEF goodwill ambassador in Turkey, about which she said: "I think there is nothing that cannot be done with love. If we combine power with love, we can overcome many problems".

Together with Hülya Koçyiğit, Filiz Akın and Fatma Girik, she is an icon for a golden age in Turkish cinematography and is regarded as one of the four most important actresses in Turkish cinema. Out of these actresses, Şoray is the only one who also pursued a career in film directing, and directed the movies Dönüş (1972), Azap (1973), Bodrum Hâkimi (1976), Yılanı Öldürseler (1981), and Uzaklarda Arama (2015).

Early life
Şoray was born in Eyüp, Istanbul, as the first child of a family of government officials. Her father was of Circassian descent, while her maternal grandfather was a 
Turkish immigrant from Thessaloniki.

While she was studying at Fatih Girls High School as a daughter of one of the landowners in Karagümrük, she visits a set with actor Emel Yıldız who had starred in Panter Emel, and there with the encouragement of Türker İnanoğlu she decides to pursue a career in cinema. Türkân Şoray recounts her memory of starting her cinema career:

Career

While studying at Fatih Kız Lisesi middle school, the homeowner’s daughter of their house in Karagümrük later known as “Panter Emel” and Türkân Şoray went to the same film set. With incentive from Türker İnanoğlu, she made her first steps into Yeşilçam. Instead of Emel Yıldız marking the beginning of Türkan Şoray’s career the 1960s “Köyde Bir Kız Sevdim” co-starred with Baki Tamer. Türkân Şoray recounts the memories of her introduction to cinema as such:

”Before entering cinema a film set arrived to our neighborhood. They were going to film a set of the movie in our neighborhood. When I saw the leading role actress I thought to myself ‘what a beautiful woman’. That woman was Muhterem Nur. As I was looking dumbfounded a man approached me and asked ‘Do you want to act in the movies too?’. I was scared and ran home immediately. I learned later on that, that man was Memduh Ün. Back then I ran from a movie set but later on movie sets became my life”recounts Türkân Şoray

Şoray earned her first Golden Orange award in 1964 for her role as Nermin opposite Ekrem Bora in the movie Acı Hayat which was directed by Metin Erksan. In 1968, Şoray received her second Golden Orange award for her work in the movie Vesikalı Yarim, written by Safa Önal and based on Sait Faik Abasıyanık's "Menekşeli Vadi". At the Istanbul Film Festival, where the renewed copy of the film was republished many years later, Şoray said:

Later career
She went on working with respectable directors in later years. One of them was Atıf Yılmaz, with whom she would work in both dramas and comedies. In the 1970s she also acted in films with a more realistic theme. She also directed four films in those years. Her most applauded films in the 1970s included Selvi Boylum Al Yazmalım, Hazal, Sultan, Dönüş and Baraj. In those films she was mostly accompanied by the famous Turkish actor Kadir İnanır.

Awards
She won her first of many awards when she received the best actress prize at the 'Antalya Golden Orange Film Festival' for the film Acı Hayat (Bitter Life).

At the end of the 1960s, she was named one of the four greatest actresses of the Turkish cinema. She was highly applauded for her choices in film and her ability to act in a wide variety of roles. She starred in Vesikalı Yarim (My Licensed Love)  for which she was awarded the Best Actress Award for the second time in the Antalya Film Festival.

In the 1980s she began portraying women with problems of female identity; Mine, Rumuz Goncagül (Nickname: Goncagül), On Kadın (Ten Women) etc. She won her third Best Actress Award from the Antalya Film Festival in 1987 with the film Hayallerim, Aşkım ve Sen(My Dreams, My Love and You), in which she portrays three different women, each of whom is a facet of Türkân Şoray herself.

Some of her awards are:

 Antalya Film Festival Best Actress Award
 1964-Acı Hayat
 1968-Vesikalı Yarim
 1987-Hayallerim, Aşkım ve Sen
 1994-Bir Aşk Uğruna
 Moscow Film Festival Grand Jury Prize
 1973-Dönüş (her directorial debut)
 Tashkent Film Festival Best Actress Award
 1978-Selvi Boylum Al Yazmalım
 Bastia Film Festival Best Actress Award
 1992-Soğuktu ve Yağmur Çiseliyordu
1996 Istanbul Film Festival, Honorary Cinema Award
1999 Rome Film Festival, Honorary Award

She is also a member of Eurasian Academy.

Filmography

As an actress

As a director

 Dönüş – 1972
 Azap – 1973
 Bodrum Hakimi – 1976
 Yılanı Öldürseler – 1981 (with Şerif Gören)
 Uzaklarda Arama – 2015

Music albums
Türkan Şoray Söylüyor (2015)

Books 
 "Sinemam ve Ben" (autobiography), Türkan Şoray, NTV Yayınları, 2012, Istanbul.

Books about her 
 "Türkân Şoray, Bir Yıldız Böyle Doğdu" (documentary novel), Agah Özgüç, Göl publications, 1974, Istanbul.
 "Sümbül Sokağın Tutsak Kadını" (biography), Atilla Dorsay, Remzi Bookstore, 1997, Istanbul. 
 "Türkân Şoray''" (biography), Agah Özgüç, Açıkşehir publications, 2001, Istanbul. 
 "Türkân Şoray ile Yüz Yüze", Feridun Andaç, Drahma publications, 2010, Istanbul.
 "50 Yıllık Aşk - Türkan Şoray", Ercan Akarsu, Esen Books, 2014, Istanbul. 
 "Sinema Emekçisi - Türkan Şoray", Ercan Akarsu, Esen Books, 2015, Istanbul.

See also
 Nazan Şoray
 Nazan Saatci

References

External links

 
 

1945 births
Living people
People from Eyüp
Turkish people of Circassian descent
State Artists of Turkey
Turkish film actresses
Turkish film directors
Turkish women film directors
Best Actress Golden Orange Award winners
Best Actress Golden Boll Award winners
Golden Orange Life Achievement Award winners
20th-century Turkish actresses